Houplain is a surname. Notable people with the surname include:

 Jacques Houplain (1920–2020), French painter and engraver
 Jules Houplain (born 1999), French actor
 Myriane Houplain (born 1947), French politician

Surnames of French origin
French-language surnames